Copernicus is a large crater on Mars, with a diameter close to 300 km. It is located south of the planet's equator in the heavily cratered highlands of Terra Sirenum in the Phaethontis quadrangle at 48.8°S and 191.2°E.  Its name was approved in 1973, and it was named after Nicolaus Copernicus.

Description 
The impact that formed Copernicus likely occurred more than 3 billion years ago. The crater contains smaller craters within its basin and is particularly notable for gully formations that are presumed to be indicative of past liquid water flows.  Many small channels exist in this area; they are further evidence of liquid water.  On the basis of their form, aspects, positions, and location amongst and apparent interaction with features thought to be rich in water ice, many researchers believed that the processes carving the gullies involve liquid water. However, this remains a topic of active research.  
As soon as gullies were discovered, researchers began to image many gullies over and over, looking for possible changes.  By 2006, some changes were found.  Later, with further analysis it was determined that the changes could have occurred by dry granular flows rather than being driven by flowing water. With continued observations many more changes were found  in Gasa Crater and others.  
With more repeated observations, more and more changes have been found; since the changes occur in the winter and spring, experts are tending to believe that gullies were formed from dry ice. Before-and-after images demonstrated the timing of this activity coincided with seasonal carbon-dioxide frost and temperatures that would not have allowed for liquid water.  When dry ice frost changes to a gas, it may lubricate dry material to flow especially on steep slopes.  In some years frost, perhaps as thick as 1 meter.

Dust devil tracks 

Many areas on Mars experience the passage of giant dust devils. A thin coating of fine bright dust covers most of the Martian surface.  When a dust devil goes by it blows away the coating and exposes the underlying dark surface.  Dust devils have been seen from the ground and high overhead from orbit. They have even blown the dust off of the solar panels of the two Rovers on Mars, thereby greatly extending their lives.  The twin Rovers were designed to last for 3 months, instead they have lasted for years and are still going. Opportunity Rover has lasted over 10 years and is still sending back data as of August 2017.   The pattern of the tracks have been shown to change every few months.

Gallery

See also 
 List of craters on Mars

References

External links 

 Google Mars linked to the Newton Crater
 
 Newton Crater
 Solar Views

Impact craters on Mars
Phaethontis quadrangle